The United Nations Secretary-General is the head of the Secretariat, one of the principal divisions of the United Nations. Many of the individuals who have served as the world body's top office have written memoirs, either before, during or after their terms of office (service).

Secretaries-General of the United Nations
Secretary-General of the United Nations memoirs